Einar Pettersen was a Norwegian sport wrestler.

He represented the club TIL National. He won a silver medal at the 1922 World Wrestling Championships. He was awarded the King's Cup at the national championships in 1927.

References

Date of birth unknown
Date of death unknown
Norwegian male sport wrestlers
World Wrestling Championships medalists
20th-century Norwegian people